Duophonic Ultra High Frequency Disks Limited (also known as Duophonic Records or Duophonic Super 45s) is a British independent record label formed by English-French rock band Stereolab in 1991. The label has two imprints: Duophonic Ultra High Frequency Disks for UK Stereolab releases licensed to various labels worldwide, and Duophonic Super 45s for releases of other artists and certain Stereolab UK-only releases. Duophonic's first release was Stereolab's debut EP Super 45 (1991), limited to 880 copies; of these, forty copies had handmade covers that were produced by Martin Pike in his father's garage.

Bands that have released records on Duophonic include Broadcast, the High Llamas, Labradford, Tortoise, Pram, Yo La Tengo, the Notwist, and Apparat Organ Quartet. Daft Punk, one of the most successful electronic bands of the 1990s, released their first songs under the name Darlin' on the 1993 Duophonic compilation Shimmies in Super 8. Duophonic's most successful release is Stereolab's Emperor Tomato Ketchup (1996), which was licensed to Elektra Records outside the UK and has sold over 60,000 copies worldwide.

Duophonic is managed by Martin Pike, and is owned by Tim Gane (34%), Laetitia Sadier (34%), and Pike (32%). Although founded in 1991, the label did not become a limited company until 25 August 1993, when Pike relocated from Horsham, West Sussex, to East Dulwich in the London Borough of Southwark. From there, Pike also runs Associated London Management [2008] Ltd, a company dedicated to the management of bands such as Stereolab, Broadcast, Deerhunter, Atlas Sound, and the High Llamas.

Duophonic Super 45 Discography 

DS45-01 Stereolab Super 45 10" Stereolab's first ever release. A mail order only 10" 880 copies (40 with handmade sleeves)

DS45-02 "Stunning Debut Album" 7" tracks featured are "Doubt" and "Changer" 985 copies on clear vinyl and 200 on multi-colored vinyl all w/an insert

DS45-03 Arcwelder "Favor" b/w "Plastic" 1000 copies on black 300 on amber

DS45-04 "Harmonium" b/w "Farfisa" 7" 1306 copies on amber vinyl all came w/a fluorescent orange sticker

DS45-05/06 Shimmies in Super 8 Double pack with a fold out sleeve. Each band had a side and they were: Stereolab with "Revox"; Huggy Bear with "Trafalgar Square," "Godziller," "More Music From Bells," "Snow White Rose Red"; Colm with "Soundtrack"; Darlin with "Cindy So Loud" and "Darlin'" 800 copies of which 400 had stickers. all copies were numbered. One 7" was green vinyl, one was white.

DS45-07 Herzfeld "Two Mothers" and "Who the Scroungers Are" 1000 copies

DS45-08 Herzfeld "The Sack" mini LP 1000 copies

DS45-09 Tortoise "Gamera" b/w "Cliff Dweller Society" 12" 1500 on red vinyl 1500 on clear 1500 on black and 1000 on fluorescent yellow

DS45-10 Split tour 7" with Yo La Tengo "The Long Hair of Death" by Stereolab and "Evanescent Psychic Pez Drop" by Yo La Tengo 3000 on fluorescent yellow vinyl with a fluorescent yellow sticker

DS33-11 Stereolab/Nurse With Wound "Simple Headphone Mind" 12" 3000 on black vinyl, 1000 on translucent yellow vinyl A limited run of promo CDs were also pressed

DS45-12 Labradford "Scenic Recovery" b/w "Underwood 5ive" 10" 2500 copies on black vinyl

DS45-13

DS45-14 Broadcast "Living Room" b/w "Phantom" 3092 copies on black vinyl

DS45-15 Pram "Music For Your Movies"  CD-EP/12" 1488 copies on black vinyl 2213 copies on CD

DS45-16 Broadcast "The Book Lovers" CD-EP/12" 1968 copies on black vinyl 2882 copies on CD

DS45-17 Splitting the Atom "Splitting The Atom Parts 1 and 2" b/w "Monkey Brain" 7" Features Andrew Ramsay and Simon Holliday augmented by Mary Hansen and Sonic Boom 3234 copies on black vinyl

DS45-18 Turn On - Turn On (CD, MiniAlbum) Features Tim Gane, Sean O'Hagan and Andrew Ramsay

DS45-19 Uilab - Fires (12")

DS33-20 Clear Spot - Moonman Bop (7")

DS45-21 Designer - Designer (12")

DS45-22

DS45-23 Notwist, The - Shrink (LP)

DS45-24 Dymaxion - Forty Five Revolutions Per Minute Sound (7")

DS45-CD25 Stereolab & Brigitte Fontaine / Monade - Caliméro / Cache Cache (CD, Single)

DS45-CD26/DS33-26 Kev Hopper - Whispering Foils

DS45-27 Imitation Electric Piano - Imitation Electric Piano (12", EP)

DS45-28 High Llamas - Buzzle Bee

DS45-CD29/DS33-29 Dymaxion - Dymaxion*4+3=38:33

DS45-30 Stereolab - Free Witch And No-Bra Queen (7")

DS45-CD31 Minnow - Out Of The Woods

DS33-32/DS45-CD32 Monade - Socialisme Ou Barbarie

DS33-33/DS45-CD33 Imitation Electric Piano - Trinity Neon

DS45-CD34 Apparat Organ Quartett - Romantika

DS45-CD35  High Llamas - Beet, Maize & Corn

DS45-36 Seeland - Wander / Pherox

DS45-37 The Monincs/Zinade - Play Kevin Ayers (7", Single)

DS45-38 Stereolab - Solar Throw-Away (7", Single, Ltd)

DS45-CD39 Imitation Electric Piano - Blow It Up, Burn It Down, Kick It 'Til It Bleeds

DS45-40 Seeland - Crimson EP (12", EP)

DS45-41 Harry Kari Connection, The - I Can't Sleep / How I Feel / Haunted (7", Lim)

DS45-42 Junior Electronics (LP, 300 copies)

DS45-43 Stereolab - Explosante Fixe (7", Single, Ltd)

DS45-44 Cavern Of Anti-Matter - Play In Fabric (7", Single, Ltd)

DS45-45 Astrel K - You Could If You Can (7", Single, Ltd)

See also
 List of record labels

References

Discographies

External links
 Official site (archived)

British independent record labels
Stereolab
Rock record labels
Indie rock record labels